Breville Group Limited or simply Breville is an Australian multinational manufacturer and marketer of home appliances, headquartered in the inner suburb of Alexandria, Sydney. The company's brands include Breville, Kambrook and Ronson (outside of North America).  In the UK and Europe the company goes to market as the Sage brand and as the Breville brand in the rest of the world.

History
The company was established in 1932, by Bill O’Brien and Harry Norville, who combined their two surnames to form the company name. The company originally manufactured radios before later expanding into kitchen appliances in the 1960s. The company owns and markets several brands, including Breville (worldwide excluding Europe), Kambrook, Ronson, Sage by Heston Blumenthal, Solis, Gastroback, Stollar, Catler, Bork and Riviera&Bar.

Breville has been listed on the Australian stock exchange since 1999, and in 2016 relocated its headquarters to a new purpose-built 48,437 sq ft building in the Sydney suburb of Alexandria.

Timeline
1932 Breville is founded.
1955 Breville sell their Precedent brand of televisions.
1974 The popular Snack’n’Sandwich maker is invented.
1999 Breville is listed on the Australian Stock Exchange, .
2013 Breville entered into a partnership with Nespresso to manufacture coffee machines.
2017 Breville acquires water purification brand Aquaport and air purifier brand Cli-Mate.
2020 Breville acquires coffee grinder company Baratza.

See also
List of companies of Australia

References

External links
 Official site
 Kambrook

Manufacturing companies based in Sydney
Electronics companies established in 1932
Companies listed on the Australian Securities Exchange
Australian companies established in 1932
Home appliance brands
Home appliance manufacturers
Home appliance manufacturers of Australia